Benedikt Gröndal is the name of:

 (1762–1825), judge and poet
Benedikt Sveinbjarnarson Gröndal (1826–1907), naturalist and poet
Benedikt Sigurðsson Gröndal (1924–2010), Prime Minister of Iceland